Skylark is a genus of birds. It may also refer to particular species in that genus, such as the Eurasian skylark.

Aircraft
Cessna 175 Skylark, an American aircraft design
Dova DV-1 Skylark, a Czech ultralight aircraft
Skylark (rocket), a British sounding rocket first launched in 1957 from Woomera, Australia
Skylark (UAV), a miniature unmanned aerial vehicle developed by Elbit
a series of gliders produced in Britain in the 1950s and 1960s:
Slingsby Skylark
Slingsby T.41 Skylark 2
Slingsby Skylark 3
Slingsby Skylark 4
Robertson Skylark SRX-1 an STOL aircraft developed by Robertson Development Corp. in the mid-1950s.
Vortech Skylark, an American helicopter design

Books
Skylark (novel), the title of the sequel to Sarah, Plain and Tall by Patricia MacLachlan
 Skylark, the title of the English translation of the novel Pacsirta by the Hungarian author Dezső Kosztolányi
Skylark (publisher), an imprint of Bantam Books
Skylark (series), a series of 4 novels by E. E. Smith, which features a spaceship called Skylark
To a Skylark, is a poem completed by Percy Bysshe Shelley in late June 1820

Film
Dave Skylark, host of Skylark Tonight in the 2014 action-comedy The Interview, who was portrayed by James Franco
Skylark (1941 film)
Skylark (1993 film), starring Glenn Close and Christopher Walken, a sequel to Sarah, Plain and Tall
Sky Larks, a 1934 Walter Lantz film starring Oswald the Lucky Rabbit

Music
Skylark (US musician), a professional bass player and singer associated with the American band The Doobie Brothers
Skylark (Canadian band), a Canadian pop music group best known for their 1973 hit song "Wildflower"
Skylark (Italian band), an Italian power metal band
"Skylark" (song), a 1942 jazz standard by Johnny Mercer (lyricist) and Hoagy Carmichael (composer)
Skylark (Paul Desmond album), 1973
Skylark (Shirley Scott album), 1991
Skylark (George Cables album), 1996

Vehicles
Buick Skylark, a model of American automobile (1953–1998)
Hupp Skylark, a model of American automobile (1939–40)

Other
Skylark Group, a North Indian poultry company
 Skylark, a 1929 aviation comic strip by Elmer Woggon.
USS Skylark
Noah and Nelly in... SkylArk, a series of short animated children's programmes
Skylark, the current name for the fictional comic book character originally known as Lady Lark
Team Skylark, a fictional all female French racing team on the animation series Immortal Grand Prix (or IGPX)
The unofficial name of the Edward E. Smith Memorial Award
Chip Skylark, a character in The Fairly OddParents
Starlark, a Python-based configuration language used for monorepos that was formerly known as Skylark

See also
Skylarking (disambiguation)
Sky Larkin, a UK indie rock band
"Alouette" (song), an 1879 children's song about plucking a skylark (alouette is the French word for skylark)
Montreal Alouettes, a Canadian football team named after the bird and the song